Dina Hayek (born Collet Bou Gergis on June 10, 1982) is a Lebanese actress and singer. She gained popularity by the release of her second album, Katabtillak. Her father is Lebanese and her mother is Syrian.

Career
Hayek started her career year 1999 as a solo artist, after being discovered by composer George Mardorzian. Her debut album, Sehir Al Gharam was released in 2003 on the record label Music Master International, and included the single by the same name which was backed by Egyptian music channel Melody TV.

Hayek's commercial breakthrough came when she signed a contract with the Saudi Arabian record label Rotana. Her second album, titled Katabtillak, was released in 2005. It included the singles, "Katabtillak" and "Darb el-Hawa'a". Hayek's third album, Ta'ala Albi, was released in 2006. It included the single by the same name.

Hayek has admitted that some Rotana artists, such as singer Elissa, get more attention from the record company executives than the rest. She was also very disappointed with the promotional efforts made for Ta'ala Albi, and the low sales figures – compared to Katabtillak – in both Egypt and the Persian Gulf region. She also showed very disappointment in Rotana for claiming that they were not able to secure her a performance at the 2007 Hala Febrayer Festival in Kuwait, and later that year she eventually resigned from her contract with Rotana. She is currently working on new material with the support from Melody TV.

Discography
Sehir Al Gharam (2003)
Katabtillak (2005)
Ta'ala Albi (2006)

The Lyrics to her song 'Helwe Mennak' found on her 2005 album 'Katabtillak' were written by Raphael Maroun.

References

1982 births
Living people
21st-century Lebanese women singers
Lebanese people of Syrian descent
People from Jounieh
Lebanese Christians
Lebanese film actresses
Lebanese television actresses